The Eastern Intercollegiate Wrestling Association (EIWA) is an NCAA Division I collegiate wrestling conference. It held its first championship tournament in 1905, making it the oldest wrestling conference in the NCAA. The EIWA's charter members were Columbia, Penn, Princeton, and Yale. Thirty-two different schools have been members of the EIWA during its history, all schools from the Eastern United States.  Its current members are schools in the Northeast whose main conferences do not sponsor wrestling, including the Patriot League, America East Conference, Northeast Conference, and Colonial Athletic Association, as well as all of the Ivy League schools that sponsor wrestling. Franklin & Marshall is the only Division III school that competes in Division I wrestling.

Current members
The EIWA currently has 17 members:

 American University
 United States Military Academy (Army)
 Binghamton University
 Brown University
 Bucknell University
 Columbia University
 Cornell University
 Drexel University
 Franklin and Marshall College
 Harvard University
 Hofstra University
 Lehigh University
 Long Island University
 United States Naval Academy (Navy)
 University of Pennsylvania (Penn)
 Princeton University
 Sacred Heart University

Recent success and developments
At the 2011 NCAA Wrestling Championship, three EIWA teams placed in the top 10: Cornell placed 2nd, American University was 5th, and Lehigh finished 8th. In 2012, Cornell finished 4th and Lehigh 8th; Cornell was also 5th in 2013 and 7th in 2014.

In the same period, the EIWA had forty-four All-Americans; also, Kyle Dake of Cornell was awarded the Dan Hodge Trophy as national wrestler of the year and was named most outstanding wrestler of the NCAA tournament after becoming the first NCAA wrestler ever to win four national championships in four different weight classes in consecutive years.

In 2013, the EIWA absorbed Boston University, Hofstra, Drexel, and Binghamton after the Colonial Athletic Association ceased sponsorship of wrestling, making an 18-team conference for the 2013–14 season. The EIWA was reduced to 16 in 2014-15 with the departure of Rutgers to the Big Ten Conference and discontinuation of the BU program.

The most recent change in the EIWA membership was announced in April 2019. Long Island University announced that the wrestling team that had represented its Post campus in Division II would join the EIWA once the merger of the athletic programs of its Brooklyn and Post campuses took effect in July 2019. The renamed LIU Sharks joined NEC rival Sacred Heart, bringing the conference to seventeen members.

For the 2020–21 season, the EIWA had ten schools competing, as the six Ivy League schools and the Centennial Conference (which includes Franklin & Marshall) did not hold winter sports due to the COVID-19 pandemic.

Membership timeline

Former EIWA schools 
 Pennsylvania State University moved to the Eastern Wrestling League then to the Big Ten Conference
 Temple University*
 Syracuse University*
 Yale University*
 University of Pittsburgh moved to the Eastern Wrestling League and later the Atlantic Coast Conference
 College of William & Mary*
 Dartmouth College*
 Wilkes University moved to Division III
 United States Coast Guard Academy moved to Division III
 University of Virginia moved to the ACC
 United States Merchant Marine Academy moved to Division III
 East Stroudsburg University moved to Division II
 Boston University*
 Rutgers University–New Brunswick moved to the Big Ten Conference

*School dropped the program

League champions

* Tie for team title

Total championships

See also
 NCAA Wrestling Team Championship

Notes

External links
 
 Conference tourney results since 1926

 
1905 establishments in the United States
Sports leagues established in 1905